The Bihar famine of 1966–1967 was a famine in Bihar and eastern Uttar Pradesh. The official death toll from starvation in the Bihar drought was 2353, roughly half of which occurred in the state of Bihar.

The annual production of food grains had dropped in Bihar from 7.5 million tonnes in 1965–1966 to 7.2 million tonnes in 1966–1967 during the Bihar drought. There was an even sharper drop in 1966–1967 to 4.3 million tonnes. The national grain production dropped from 89.4 million tonnes in 1964–1965 to 72.3 in 1965–1966 — a 19% drop. The rise in prices of food grains caused migration and starvation, but the public distribution system, relief measures by the government, and voluntary organizations limited the impact. On a number of occasions, the Indian-government sought food and grain from the United States to provide replacement for damaged crops, however US food aid was limited by Lyndon B. Johnson in retaliation for Indian criticism on the US's role in the Vietnam War.

See also 
Deccan famine of 1630–1632
Famine in India
Bihar famine of 1873–1874

References

Bibliography
 
 

Famines in India
Disasters in Bihar